Sean Tucker may refer to:

 Sean D. Tucker (born 1952), American aerobatic aviator
 Sean Tucker (American football) (born 2001), American running back